The Vickers Crossley armoured car a/k/a the Model 25 Vickers Crossley armoured car, was a British-made military vehicle used by the British Army in India and exported to different countries, including Japan.

History and design
The Model 25 armoured car was a British designed and manufactured military vehicle, which the British Army used in India. The Model 25 was also exported. The Imperial Japanese Army (IJA) saw a need for increased mechanization, and the Kwantung Army began to import foreign-built vehicles, including the Model 25. The Kwantung Army used them during the Mukden Incident (Manchurian Incident), which was a staged event engineered by Japanese military personnel as a pretext for the Japanese invasion in 1931 of northeastern China, known as Manchuria. The Manchukuo Imperial Army that was established by Imperial Japan in Manchuria, later received some Model 25s for use.

The Imperial Japanese Navy (IJN) also imported the Model 25 during the early 1930s for use in China. The Model 25 was used specially by the Special Naval Landing Forces during the hostilities between Japanese military and the Chinese 19th Route Army in what became known as the January 28 Incident or Shanghai Incident in 1932. The armoured cars were imported to strengthen the Japanese forces in and around the urban city and port area.

The Argentine Regiment of Mounted Grenadiers received 6 Vickers-Crossley Model 26 armoured cars in 1928. Derived from the British Indian Army cars, they had 2 axles instead of 3. They saw action during the 1930 Argentine coup d'état and some are later used by the Argentine Federal Police.

The vehicle used riveted and welded armor with a thickness of 6 mm. It had a hemispherical turret, which mounted twin 7.7 mm water-cooled Vickers machine guns with a domed cupola. The engine produced 50 hp giving the vehicle a top speed of 65 to 70 km/h.

Notes

References

External links
 Taki's Imperial Japanese Army Page - Akira Takizawa
 The Crossley "IGA1" armoured car

Armoured cars of the interwar period
Armoured cars of Japan
Military vehicles introduced in the 1920s
Armoured cars of Manchukuo
Armoured cars of the United Kingdom